The Avesta is the primary collection of sacred texts of Zoroastrianism.

Avesta may also refer to:

Places 
 Avesta Municipality (Avesta kommun), one of 290 municipalities of Sweden
 Avesta (locality), a locality of the above municipality in the traditional province of Dalarna, Sweden
Avesta AIK, a sports club in Avesta, Sweden